Alaa Ibrahim (Arabic:) (born 1 March 1975) is an Egyptian footballer.

Career
Ibrahim made his international debut for Egypt in a friendly match against South Africa on 16 December 1998.

In January 2010, he was loaned to Smouha for the rest of the season. The move was intended to utilize Ibrahim's experience to help the Alexandria-based team win promotion to the Egyptian Premier League.

References

1975 births
Living people
Egyptian footballers
Egypt international footballers
Al Ahly SC players
Al Masry SC players
Petrojet SC players
Smouha SC players
Association football forwards
Expatriate footballers in Jordan
People from Minya Governorate
Egyptian Premier League players
21st-century Egyptian people